Xymene is a genus of predatory sea snails, marine gastropod molluscs in the family Muricidae, the rock snails, found in New Zealand.

Species 
Species and subspecies within the genus Xymene include:
 Xymene convexus (Suter, 1909)
 Xymene erectus (Suter, 1909)
 Xymene huttoni (Murdoch, 1900)
 Xymene plebeius (Hutton, 1873)
 Xymene pumilus (Suter, 1909)
 Xymene teres (Finlay, 1930)
 Xymene warreni Ponder, 1972
Species brought into synonymy
 Xymene ambiguus (Philippi, 1844): synonym of Zeatrophon ambiguus (Philippi, 1844)
 Xymene aucklandicus (E. A. Smith, 1902): synonym of Axymene aucklandicus (E. A. Smith, 1902)
 Xymene gouldi (Cossmann, 1903): synonym of Fuegotrophon pallidus (Broderip, 1833)
 Xymene inferus (Hutton, 1878): synonym of Xymene plebeius (Hutton, 1873)
 Xymene mortenseni (Odhner, 1924): synonym of Zeatrophon mortenseni (Odhner, 1924)
 Xymene oliveri Marwick, 1924: synonym of Xymene pusillus (Suter, 1907)
 Xymene pulcherrimus (Finlay, 1930): synonym of Zeatrophon pulcherrimus Finlay, 1930
 Xymene pusillus (Suter, 1907): synonym of Xymenella pusilla (Suter, 1907)
 Xymene quirindus Iredale, 1915: synonym of Xymene traversi (Hutton, 1873)
 Xymene robustus Finlay, 1924: synonym of Xymene pumilus (Suter, 1909)
 Xymene traversi (Hutton, 1873): synonym of Axymene traversi (Hutton, 1873)

References 

 Powell A W B, New Zealand Mollusca, William Collins Publishers Ltd, Auckland, New Zealand 1979 
 W.F. Pondser, A review of the genus Xymene Iredale of New Zealand (Mollusca: Muricidae), Journal of the Royal Society of New Zealand, 1972, vol. 2 (4), pp. 471-499 
 Bruce A. Marshall, Molluscan and brachiopod taxa introduced by F. W. Hutton in The New Zealand journal of science; Journal of the Royal Society of New Zealand, Volume 25, Issue 4, 1995

 
Pagodulinae